The United Kingdom's component of the 2019 European Parliament election was held on Thursday 23 May 2019 and the local results were to be announced after 22:00 BST on Sunday 26 May 2019 when all the other EU countries had voted although the counting of votes started at 18:00 BST on that evening. The nine English regions and Wales announced their regional results overnight. Local results were also announced overnight in all Scottish council areas with the single exception of Na h-Eileanan Siar (Western Isles), which did not count their votes until the following morning due to local opposition to counting on the Sabbath. Thus the Scottish national declaration did not take place until around lunchtime on Monday 27 May. Northern Ireland also did not start to count their votes until the Monday morning as votes are by tradition not counted here on Sunday either, as a religious observance. Furthermore, due to the use of the single transferable vote (STV), it was expected that counting could take up to two days, but in the event it was completed on 27 May.

In the election there were a total of 373 voting areas across twelve regions, using the same regional boundaries as used in all previous European Parliamentary elections since 1999, under the provisions of the European Parliamentary Elections Act 2002, with votes counted at local authority level. In England the 317 local government districts were used as the voting areas; these consist of all unitary authorities, all metropolitan boroughs, all shire districts, the London boroughs, the City of London and the Isles of Scilly. The nine regions of England which make up the regional constituencies  were then used to count the votes, with Gibraltar being regarded as part of South West England. Northern Ireland due to using a different form of Proportional representation than the rest of the UK was a single voting area and national constituency. In Scotland the 32 Scottish council areas were used as voting areas within its single national constituency whilst in Wales the 22 Welsh council areas were used as the voting areas within its single national constituency.

Overview

Results by constituency and local areas

England

East Midlands (5 seats)

The East Midlands electoral region is broken down into 40 local council areas.

Best and worst results for each party

East of England (7 seats)

The East of England electoral region is broken down into 45 local council areas.

Best and worst results for each party

London (8 seats)

The Greater London electoral region is broken down into the 33 London Borough areas.

Best and worst results for each party

North East England (3 seats)

The North East England electoral region is broken down into 12 local council areas.

Full results for each party

North West England (8 seats)

The North West England electoral region is broken down into 39 local council areas.

Best and worst results for each party

South East England (10 seats)

The South East England electoral region is broken down into 67 local council areas.

Best and worst results for each party

South West England  (6 seats)

The South West England electoral region is broken down into 30 local council areas and Gibraltar.

Gibraltar

Best and worst results for each party

West Midlands (7 seats)

The West Midlands electoral region is broken down into 30 voting areas.

Best and worst results for each party

Yorkshire and the Humber (6 seats)

The Yorkshire and the Humber electoral region is broken down into 21 local council areas.

Best and worst results for each party

Northern Ireland (3 seats)

Scotland (6 seats)

The Scotland electoral region is broken down into 32 local council areas.

Best and worst results for each party

Wales (4 seats)

The Wales electoral region is broken down into 22 local council areas.

Estimated results by Westminster constituency

References

2019 elections in the United Kingdom
United Kingdom
European Parliament elections in the United Kingdom